The Ethiopian siskin or Abyssinian siskin (Serinus nigriceps) is a species of finch in the family Fringillidae.

It is found only in Ethiopia, usually at altitudes above  in the Ethiopian Highlands.

The bird's natural habitat is subtropical or tropical high-altitude Afromontane grassland.

Phylogeny
It has been obtained by Antonio Arnaiz-Villena, et al.

References 

Ethiopian siskin
Endemic birds of Ethiopia
Fauna of the Ethiopian Highlands
Ethiopian siskin
Taxonomy articles created by Polbot